A cave monastery is a monastery built in caves, with possible outside facilities. The 3rd-century monk St. Antony the Great, known as the founder of monasticism, lived in a cave.

Albania
Qafthanë Cave Church, cave church near Urakë 
St. Mary's Church, cave church in Maligrad, an island in the Prespa lake
Armenia
Geghard cave monastery/fortress
Bulgaria
Aladzha Monastery
Albotin Monastery
 Basarbovo Monastery
Rock-hewn Churches of Ivanovo
Cave monasteries of Krepcha
Monasteries of Provadia
Cave monasteries on the Plateau of Shumen
Cave monasteries of Tervel
Ethiopia
Monolithic church
France
Abbey of Saint-Roman, Beaucaire, Gard
Georgia
David Gareja monastery complex
Vanis Kvabebi cave monastery/fortress, Javakheti Plateau
Vardzia cave city and monastery
Greece
various cave hermitages at Meteora
various cave hermitages at Mount Athos
caves at Karoulia

Hungary
Gellért Hill Cave chapels and monastery, Budapest
Iraq
Rabban Hormizd Monastery, Alqosh
Mar Qayuma Monastery, Dooreh
Israel
Qumran Caves, once inhabited by the Essenes
North Macedonia
Kališta Monastery, Struga
Romania
Basarabi Cave Complex
Corbii de Piatră
Nămăiești
Russia
Monastery of the Caves, Nizhny Novgorod
Pskov Cave Monastery, Pskov Oblast
Divnogorye and Saviour Convent, Voronezh Oblast
Serbia
Blagoveštenje
Crna Reka
Gornjak
Kađenica
Churches of Kovilje Monastery
Church of Sts. Peter and Paul, also known as the Cave Church, 14th-century church in Lukovo
Church of Sts. Peter and Paul, in Rsovci, where was painted a unique fresco of bald Jesus
Hermitage of St. Peter Koriški
Savina
Thailand
Wat Tham Khan, Sakon Nakhon province
Tiger Cave Temple (Wat Tam Sua), Krabi
Turkey
Cappadocia cave monasteries
Cave monastery of İnceğiz
Church of Saint Peter
Ukraine 
Assumption Cave Monastery and Inkerman Cave Monastery in the Crimea
Assumption Cave Monastery in Zymne, near Volodymyr
 Bakota Cave Monastery in Bakota, near Kamianets-Podilskyi
 Eletsky Monastery in Chernihiv

See also
 Indian rock-cut architecture
 Monolithic architecture
 Monolithic church

References

"Mysteries of caves in the Chernihiv area", and article in Dzerkalo Tyzhnia, (the Mirror Weekly), January, 2004, available online in Russian and in Ukrainian

 
Monasteries
cave
Monasteries, cave
Subterranea (geography)